2-Methyltetrahydroquinoline is one of the methyl-substituted derivatives of tetrahydroquinoline.  A colorless oil, it is a chiral compound owing to the presence of the methyl substituent. It is produced by the hydrogenation of quinaldine. It is of interest in medicinal chemistry.

References

Tetrahydroquinolines